The 1983 Western Kentucky Hilltoppers football team represented Western Kentucky University as an independent during the 1983 NCAA Division I-AA football season. Led by 16th-year head coach Jimmy Feix, the Hilltoppers compiled a record of 2–8–1. The team's captains were Paul Gray and Walter York.

Schedule

References

Western Kentucky Hilltoppers football seasons
{Western Kentucky Hilltoppers football